Auguste Joseph Peiffer (1832–1886) was a French sculptor, mainly working in bronze on allegorical and mythological subjects. He exhibited at the Paris Salon from 1865 to 1879.

The Musée Antoine Vivenel at Compiègne hold his statuettes of Arab playing the mandolin and Arab playing the tambour.

External links
 

1832 births
1886 deaths
19th-century French sculptors
French male sculptors
19th-century French male artists